Waterval Estate is a suburb of Johannesburg, South Africa.It is located in Region B of the City of Johannesburg Metropolitan Municipality, is close to Randburg's centre.

History
Prior to the discovery of gold on the Witwatersrand in 1886, the suburb lay on land on one of the original farms called Waterval. It became a suburb in 1903 and takes its name from the original farm name.

References

Johannesburg Region B